Urban Search and Rescue Massachusetts Task Force 1 or MA-TF1 is a FEMA Urban Search and Rescue Task Force based in Beverly, Massachusetts. MA-TF1 is sponsored by the city of Beverly. The team is made up of 150 people including Police, Fire, EMS and Civilians.

Deployments 
 
 below is a list of MA-TF1's deployments:

 Hurricane Luis - August 1995
 Hurricane Marilyn - September  1995
 Hurricane Opal - September 1995
 Meadow Pond Dam - March 1996
 1996 Summer Olympics - July & August 1996
 Hurricane Georges - September 1998
 Hurricane Floyd - September 1999
 Worcester Cold Storage and Warehouse fire - December 1999
 World trade center collapse - September 2001
 American Airlines Flight 587 - November 2001
 Space Shuttle Columbia disaster - February 2003
 Democratic National Convention - July 2004
 Hurricane Katrina - September 2005
 Hurricane Dennis - August 2005
 Hurricane Rita - September 2005
 Hurricane Wilma - September 2006
 Hurricane Ernesto - September 2006
 Danvers Chemical fire - November 2006
 Hurricane Gustav - August 2008
 Flooding in Fargo - March 2009
 Major Flooding - March 2010
 The Greater Springfield tornado - June 2011
 Hurricane Irene - August 2011
 Hurricane Sandy - October 2012

References

External links 

Massachusetts 1